Lioglyphostoma aguadillanum is a species of sea snail, a marine gastropod mollusk in the family Pseudomelatomidae, the turrids and allies.

There is one subspecies: Lioglyphostoma aguadillanum minor (Dall & Simpson, 1901) (exactly similar in sculpture, but of
a pale-straw color, and is 8.5 mm. long and 3 mm. in maximum diameter)

Description
The length of the shell attains 14 mm, its diameter 4 mm.

(Original description) The small, slender shell is solid. It contains nine whorls of which the first three are nepionic, smooth and polished, the subsequent elegantly axially ribbed, with two to four primary spiral threads and a fine interstitial spiral striation, essentially as figured. The shell is white with a superficial brownish tinge on the larger whorls, apex and interior of the outer lip of a delicate lilac. The outer lip is strongly thickened. The inner lip and the aperture are smooth or destitute of the denticulations usually found in Mangilia.

Distribution
This marine species occurs off Puerto Rico.

References

 * W. P. Woodring. 1970. Geology and paleontology of canal zone and adjoining parts of Panama: Description of Tertiary mollusks (gastropods: Eulimidae, Marginellidae to Helminthoglyptidae). United States Geological Survey Professional Paper 306(D):299–452

External links
 Rosenberg G., Moretzsohn F. & García E. F. (2009). Gastropoda (Mollusca) of the Gulf of Mexico, Pp. 579–699 in Felder, D. L. and D .K. Camp (eds.), Gulf of Mexico–Origins, Waters, and Biota. Biodiversity. Texas A&M Press, College Station, Texas
 
 Fossilworks: Euclathurella (Miraclathurella) aguadillana

aguadillanum
Taxa named by William Healey Dall
Taxa named by Charles Torrey Simpson
Gastropods described in 1901